In the Star Trek universe, the Dominion is an interstellar state and military superpower from the Gamma Quadrant, composed of hundreds of dominated alien species. The Dominion is commanded by The Founders, a race of shapeshifters (or Changelings as they are often referred to), responsible for both the creation of the Dominion and all strategic decisions undertaken through its history. The Dominion is administered by the Vorta, clones specifically genetically engineered by the Founders to act as field commanders, administrators, scientists and diplomats. The Jem'Hadar, also engineered by the Founders, are the military arm of the Dominion and one of the most powerful military forces in the galaxy during the Dominion's height.

The Dominion first appeared in season 2, episode 26 "The Jem'Hadar" of the television series Star Trek: Deep Space Nine and ultimately became the primary antagonists of the series until its conclusion. The Dominion waged war on the United Federation of Planets after silently annexing Cardassia in the Alpha Quadrant. The conflict spanned several years and involved many other races including the Klingons and the Romulans.

Conception

In 2002, Star Trek: Deep Space Nine producer Ira Steven Behr stated that unlike some plots, which originated from a single small idea, the creation of the Dominion villain and story arc was "very much thought out." Behr said that the earliest mention of the Dominion was purposely planted in the comic Season Two Ferengi episode, "Rules of Acquisition", to leave the audience with an impression of "how important could it be?" It was decided that the Gamma Quadrant would need an ambience that would distinguish it from the Alpha Quadrant. The producers wanted to portray the region as something other than "uncharted space", and avoid imitating the adventures of Star Trek: The Next Generation with another series of plots focusing primarily on themes of exploration. After 18 months of Deep Space Nine exposition, the producers decided to characterize the Dominion as "anti-Federation". Writer and script editor Robert Hewitt Wolfe has explained that this move also distinguished Deep Space Nine from its successor series, Star Trek: Voyager, which stars a lost Federation ship traversing the chaotic and divided Delta Quadrant of the Milky Way.

Instead of introducing one alien race, three were introduced simultaneously: the Changelings, the Vorta, and the Jem'Hadar. These three were intended to represent the front of an ancient civilization coupled together by fear, to contrast with the unity of the Federation enabled by bonds of friendship. Behr, Wolfe, writer Peter Allan Fields, and Jim Crocker attended meetings to develop the concepts of these species and found general inspiration in Isaac Asimov's Foundation Trilogy novels. Executive producer Michael Piller suggested the idea that the Founders of the Dominion be the race to which Odo belongs, toward the end of Season Two production, and discovered that Behr and Wolfe had also discussed this possibility. This character had been introduced with no knowledge of his true origins. Piller asserts the endeavor to create a new villain was one of the most difficult tasks he undertook in his work on Star Trek. Wolfe perceives similarities between the fictional Founders and the Romulan Star Empire, in that the species first uses diplomacy, deception and cultural imperialism to achieve their aims before ultimately resorting to coercion. Wolfe also characterized the Dominion as a "carrot and stick" empire, with the Vorta offering the carrot and the Jem'Hadar holding the stick.

Member races
The Dominion incorporated a vast number of planets, and their resident species, into its military and civilian ranks, including:
 Changelings/Founders (the rulers of the Dominion)
 Vorta (administrative/diplomatic/scientist class of clones; genetically engineered by the Founders)
 Jem'Hadar (shock troops under the direct command of the Vorta; genetically engineered by the Founders)
 Son'a
 Hunters
 Skreea
 Karemma
 Dosi
 Breen
 Cardassians
 T-Rogorans

Little is revealed regarding the Dominion's inner workings, other than the fact that the Jem'Hadar and Vorta fulfill the main military and administrative roles respectively.

History

Early history
The Dominion was established between two thousand and ten thousand years before the events of Star Trek: Deep Space Nine, by the Changelings, a race of liquid lifeforms capable of shapeshifting, as a means of defending themselves against the widespread persecution they faced from humanoid races (whom they called "solids"). These Changelings genetically engineered a series of slave races to act as the foot soldiers of their new empire, and were dubbed the Founders by their new creations. Over 200 years before first contact with Deep Space Nine, the Changelings' Great Link (a planet in the Gamma Quadrant where Changelings exist in their natural "gelatinous" form) had sent out 100 Changeling infants in containers through the universe in order to see how other (alien) races react to the presence of Changelings. Of those sent out, four have been accounted for:
 Odo. Sent into space as an infant, Odo ultimately arrived in the Alpha Quadrant in the region of the planet Bajor, which was under Cardassian occupation at the time. After being studied by a Bajoran scientist, he learns to take humanoid form and eventually becomes Security Chief at Deep Space Nine, a role he maintained once the Federation controlled the station. In a battle with a Changeling spy, Odo ended up killing it, thus breaking the most important rule of his people, that no Changeling may ever hurt another ("The Adversary"). He was punished by the Great Link who took away his shapeshifting abilities and forced to remain a solid in his humanoid form ("Broken Link"). Some months later, he regained his powers after trying to save a dying infant Changeling. Although his deepest desire is to rejoin the Great Link, he is reluctant to do so due to the Founders' crusade of total war against every solid in the Alpha Quadrant. In the last episode of the series, Odo does rejoin the Great Link which saves them from being totally destroyed by a genetically engineered virus. ("What You Leave Behind")
 An unnamed Changeling which took the shape of a key in a locket. Ended up in possession of Odo. ("Vortex")
 Unnamed Infant Changeling. Obtained by Odo from Quark, Odo tries to teach the infant how to shapeshift. However the infant is dying from radiation poisoning. As its last act, it joins with Odo which restores his ability to shapeshift. ("The Begotten")
 Laas. Over 200 years old, he ended up on the Valara planet whose name "Laas" means "Changeable"; he left when he realized that he was only being tolerated and would never be accepted. He ended up on Deep Space Nine, where he showed his shapeshifting skills were far more advanced than Odo's (even changing into a mist at one point). In self-defense, he killed a Klingon warrior who was going to assault him; and with the help of Major Kira, he escaped. He vowed to search the Alpha Quadrant in order to find the other missing Hundred Changelings like himself and Odo in order to create a new Great Link. ("Chimera")

First contact and escalation
The Dominion was unknown to the Alpha Quadrant powers until the discovery of the Bajoran wormhole in 2369, which facilitated exploration of the Gamma Quadrant. In 2370, Jem'Hadar troops annihilated numerous Bajoran and Federation colonies and ships in the Gamma Quadrant and captured Commander Benjamin Sisko, as the Dominion demanded the Federation stay on their side of the "anomaly". A Federation starship, the USS Odyssey, was destroyed by a kamikaze attack after the Federation rescued Sisko, as the Dominion demonstrated not only an ability to penetrate shielding, but a fanatical devotion to their cause as the suicide attack was made on a retreating ship, solely to drive the point home to the Federation. As a result of this incident, the Federation pulled the USS Defiant out of storage (which was originally designed to combat the Borg), complete with a Romulan cloaking device, and began preparations for a drastic increase in Deep Space Nine's defensive capabilities.

A Federation mission the next year to find and make peace with the Founders ended disastrously, when the peace expedition was captured and subjected to hallucinogenic manipulation to test the willingness of the Federation to appease the Dominion. As a result of this incident, it was discovered that the reclusive Founders of the organization (previously unseen) were the Changelings. The Changelings justified their actions by the need to protect their species against persecution by "solids", and also spoke of a duty and inclination to "impose order on a chaotic universe".

As a result of the continued Dominion threat, numerous Alpha Quadrant powers acted with increased preparations and paranoia, one expression of which was the Romulan attempt to forcibly collapse the wormhole. Despite the Dominion's warnings, the Federation continued to chart the Gamma Quadrant. Founders began infiltrating the Alpha Quadrant, even wreaking havoc on Earth itself. In 2371, the combined intelligence organizations of the Cardassian Union and Romulan Star Empire attempted a strike into the Gamma Quadrant with a cloaked fleet, seeking to destroy the Founders' homeworld and cripple the Dominion. Due to intensive Changeling manipulation, this attack force was ambushed while assaulting an abandoned planet that was believed to be the supposed Founder homeworld, and was completely crushed. It is later revealed that the main advocate of attacking the Dominion was a Changeling infiltrator. This failure weakened the Cardassians and Romulans and paved the way for Dominion intrusion into the Alpha Quadrant. A Changeling impersonates Federation Ambassador Krajensky and informs newly promoted Captain Sisko that there was a coup on Tzenketh. The Changeling later sabotages the Defiant and reprograms it to target the Tzenkethi in the hopes that the attack on the Tzenkethi will cause an outbreak of war, allowing the Dominion to conquer the Alpha Quadrant. The Federation stops the Changeling and takes control of the Defiant.

The quadrant was plunged into conflict when the Klingon Empire accused the Cardassian Union of being under the control of the Founders. When the Federation condemned the Klingon attack on Cardassia, Gowron banished Federation citizens from Klingon space, recalled their ambassadors and withdrew from the Khitomer Accords. The Federation and Cardassians fought months of armed combat against the Klingons. It was later revealed by Benjamin Sisko, Worf, Miles O'Brien and Odo that it was the Klingons themselves who unknowingly had a Changeling in their midst, pretending to be General Martok. Gowron rejoined the Khitomer Accords and joined to fight the Dominion.

Dominion War (2373–2375)

The Dominion gained a foothold in the Alpha Quadrant when Gul Dukat announced that the Cardassian Union was joining the Dominion in 2373. The Dominion aided the Cardassians in wiping out a Federation terrorist group known as the Maquis who opposed the Cardassians. Open hostilities began a few months later, when the Federation mined the wormhole to prevent further Dominion ships from arriving. In response, the Dominion attacked and captured Deep Space Nine while a Federation and Klingon task force destroyed a Dominion shipyard. The Alliance suffered brutal losses for over three months, until Captain Sisko organized a task force to retake Deep Space Nine. Forced to move early because of intelligence that the Dominion was on the verge of taking down the minefield, the Federation departed before a full force could be assembled and found themselves blocked and outnumbered by a Dominion-Cardassian fleet. After hours of fighting, Dominion ships were outflanked by the arrival of a large Klingon fleet, which won the running battle and allowed the Defiant to break through to Deep Space Nine. On approach to the station, Sisko discovered the minefield had been deactivated, but after his contact with the aliens known as the Bajoran Prophets, the incoming Dominion reinforcements were moved by the Prophets to another dimension. As a consequence of this military loss, the Dominion fled the station and withdrew to Cardassian territory. The Federation retained control of Deep Space Nine for the remainder of the war.

After this action, the war's intensity diminished, and for a time peace negotiations were seriously discussed. However, the Dominion went on the offensive again, capturing Betazed in a surprise assault. Threatened with Dominion penetration into the inner sphere of their territories, Federation and Klingon forces needed a new strategy. Through successful subterfuge, the Romulan Star Empire was tricked into allying with the other two Alpha Quadrant powers, as a response to rumors that the Dominion had plans to attack their empire. With the three races united against them, the Dominion was forced back once more, with the new Alliance even seizing the Cardassian planet of Chin'toka (the planet with the largest Dominion communications array, allowing the Alliance to tap into Dominion communications).

Later in the war, the mysterious race known as the Breen joined forces with the Dominion, and launched a devastating attack against Starfleet Headquarters on Earth (DS9, "The Changing Face of Evil"). Later, the Breen helped the Dominion and the Cardassians take back the Cardassian planet Chin'toka from the Alliance. Even more disheartening was their use of a unique energy draining device that drained their enemies' entire energy supply, leaving them defenseless. Originally, only Klingon ships were immune to the effects of the Breen weapon. However, Kira Nerys, acting in tandem with Cardassian rebels, stole a Breen energy draining device and delivered it to the Alliance for reverse engineering. The Dominion managed to wipe out the rebels.

A Cardassian civilian revolution against Dominion rule formed shortly thereafter, under the leadership of Legate Damar, Dukat's successor and one of the rebels not wiped out by the Dominion. His most successful attack disabled the entire planetary power grid on Cardassia. The Dominion destroyed Lakarian City in retaliation for the resistance. When word of that atrocity reached the Dominion fleet engaged in a fierce battle with Alliance forces, the Cardassian ships switched sides and attacked their former Breen and Jem'Hadar escorts. Those Dominion ships retreated to Cardassia and, on the Female Founder's orders, launched a genocidal assault on the Cardassian people, ultimately killing over 800 million Cardassians in a matter of hours. Odo was able to convince the Female Founder to surrender, thus sparing the Alliance crippling losses and preventing the entire Cardassian race from being exterminated. (DS9, "What You Leave Behind")

The Founders themselves were nearly wiped out by a plague, which was revealed to be a biological weapon engineered by agents of the secret clandestine Federation agency Section 31, who deliberately infected Odo with it, in the expectation that he would pass it through the Great Link. The plague itself was reactive to shapeshifting and Odo's infrequent shapeshifting left him free of symptoms well after the Founders began to deteriorate from the condition. Julian Bashir was able to recover the knowledge of a cure from Luther Sloan, an operative of Section 31, and manufactured a cure that saved Odo. While the Dominion was pushed back to Cardassia Prime, Odo linked with the Female Founder, curing her and simultaneously convincing her to surrender to the allied forces of the Federation. Following cessation of hostilities, the Founders were cured when Odo returned to the Great Link after a peace treaty was signed between the Dominion and the Federation.

After the War
The state of the Dominion as a political entity at the conclusion of the war has never been fully discussed in Star Trek canon. The terms of the final treaty ending the war were never shown. At the conclusion of the war, it is assumed that the Dominion still held vast territories in the Gamma Quadrant. Odo's return to the Great Link is partially intended to share with the other changelings the information he has about how the war concluded and what he knows from living with solids; presumably, this is to change the goals and tactics of the Founders to a system that coexists with the solids as opposed to a strategy of domination.

However, through Odo's sharing of intelligence with him, Worf reveals in the Star Trek: Picard episode "Seventeen Seconds" that the Founders were split on the question of whether to cooperate with the Federation to uphold the treaty, or take up revenge. The renegade faction wanting revenge is speculated to have stolen key technologies from the Federation's Daystrom Institute.

In the non-canon relaunch novels published by Pocket Books, it is revealed that the Dominion and Breen forces withdraw from Cardassian space. Through Odo's efforts, the Dominion permits visitors from the Alpha Quadrant to resume peaceful operations in the Gamma Quadrant in exchange for leaving its territory alone. Odo then begins attempting to change the nature of the Dominion by convincing the Founders to re-evaluate their views on other species, as well as encouraging certain Vorta and Jem'Hadar to behave more independently. The allied powers begin coordinating relief efforts to Cardassia, using Bajor as a staging point. The Cardassian Union is divided into separate protectorates to be occupied by the allies while the Cardassians recover. For her part in orchestrating the war, the Female Founder is sentenced to life imprisonment at Ananke Alpha, a maximum security Federation prison.

Other appearances
The Dominion is seen in the Star Trek: Armada video game. The first mission in the Federation campaign has the USS Enterprise-E defend a starbase from rogue Jem'Hadar ships. Later, the game had a Borg armada invade Dominion space to capture a cloning facility to resurrect Locutus of Borg as a clone of Jean-Luc Picard. They are seen to have two types of ships in the game, destroyers and battleships.

The Dominion also make an appearance in Star Trek: Conquest as one of the major races and have three ship types: a Jem'Hadar Scout, a Jem'Hadar Cruiser and a Jem'Hadar Battleship.

The Star Trek Online game also features appearances by the Dominion, including several playable Dominion ships and characters. It continues the story of the Dominion fleet lost in the wormhole, the changeling Laas and the fate of the Founder leader after the Dominion War. The lost fleet was flung into the future and immediately began assaulting the Alpha Quadrant, unaware the war already concluded years before. The Female Changeling is released from prison briefly, to convince the armada to stop their assault and accept the peace treaty. The 2018 expansion Victory is Life introduces Jem'hadar as a playable race, and shows the Dominion (represented by the changeling character Odo) fighting a losing war with the hur'q, an alien species with connections to Klingon history.

The Mirror Universe version of the Dominion appears in David Alan Mack's novel Star Trek: Section 31 - Disavowed, published in 2014. The mirror Dominion is much like the regular universe's version, except that the mirror Founders are much less authoritarian and are even subject to Dominion law.

References

Galactic empires
Star Trek: Deep Space Nine
Star Trek governments
Totalitarianism in fiction

de:Völker und Gruppierungen im Star-Trek-Universum#Dominion